Johanna Brunsson (1846–1920) was a Swedish weaving arts instructor and school founder.

She was the daughter of a well-off farmer in Dalsland. During the Swedish famine of 1867–1869, she became a student in the weaving school of Maria Andersson (businesswoman). In 1873, she founded her first own weaving school, in Tångelanda, which she later moved to the capital. 

She founded the famous Johanna Brunssons praktiska konstvävskola ('The Johanna Brunsson Practical Arts Weaving School') in Stockholm in 1889, which she managed until her death. Her school was famous in her time and a pioneer institution in the formal education of weaving art in Sweden, known as an institution that educated generations of weaving instructors. She also had international students from Europa, Russia and the United States.

References

Further reading 
 

1846 births
1920 deaths
19th-century Swedish businesspeople
20th-century Swedish businesspeople
Swedish weavers
Women textile artists
Swedish textile artists
19th-century Swedish businesswomen
20th-century Swedish businesswomen